Rachel Louise Grant de Longueuil (born 25 September 1977) is an English actress and TV presenter.

Early life
Grant was born on the island of Luzon in the Philippines to Michael Grant, 12th Baron de Longueuil, and Isabel Padua; her family moved to the United Kingdom when she was a baby, and she was raised in Nottingham, England. She is of Scottish, French-Canadian and Filipino descent. She is related to the British royal family through her grandfather, the 11th Baron de Longueuil, who is second cousin to Queen Elizabeth II through the Bowes-Lyon family.

Acting career
Grant played Peaceful Fountains of Desire in the James Bond film Die Another Day. One of her first TV roles was on SyFy as Nina, the hostess of horror show Sci-fright. She was Professor Myang Li in the Sky One series Brainiac: Science Abuse. She has starred in theatre and in TV shows including Emmerdale, Murder in Suburbia, Blue Murder and Casualty. She also appeared in the films Until Death, The Purifiers and more recently, in the sci-fi-fi comedy Snatchers.

Sexual assault allegation
On January 15, 2018, Grant publicly made a sexual assault allegation against actor/producer Steven Seagal, stating an incident took place in 2002, during pre-production on his direct-to-video film Out for a Kill (2003), and that she lost her job on the film after the incident. Seagal, who had been accused by other actresses of sexual assault and rape in the past, denied these allegations.

Personal life 
In November 2019, Grant married Biaggi Luggage CEO Stephen Hersh in Israel.

Filmography

Television
Emmerdale as Tanya (1998)
Masters of Combat as Kali (2001)
Sci-fright as Nina (2001)
Brainiac: Science Abuse as Professor Myang Li (2003-2007)
Blue Murder as DC Jenny Chen (2003)
Zero to Hero as Nemesis (2004)
Casualty as Marie Webster (2004)
Starhyke as Wu Oof (2006)
Murder in Suburbia as Sandra Foy (2004)
Miss Earth 2010 as a main judge (2010)
Tour Group as Tour Guide (2016)

Film
Die Another Day as "Peaceful Fountains Of Desire" (2002)
The Purifiers as Li (2004)
Brotherhood of Blood as Jill (2006)
Until Death as Maria Ronson (2007)
The Tournament as Lina Sofia (2009)
The African Game as Bian (2010)
Red Princess Blues (film) as Princess (2011)
Snatchers (film) as Edie (2017)

References

External links

1977 births
Living people
British film actresses
British television actresses
British female models
British people of Filipino descent
British people of French-Canadian descent
Filipino female models
Filipino people of Scottish descent
Filipino people of French descent
Filipino emigrants to the United Kingdom
Bowes-Lyon family
British royal family
People from Nottingham
People from Parañaque
20th-century British actresses
21st-century British actresses
Filipino people of Canadian descent
Filipino emigrants to the United States
British emigrants to the United States